The Lyre of Mesopotamia is a video art made by Sam Chegini about the reconstruction steps of the Lyres of Ur. The Lyre of Mesopotamia was unveiled in December 2009 during an international congress held by UN-Habitat and IAARA in Qazvin, Iran, among other ancient instruments.

Awards
The video was awarded as best video art in the 1st Persbookart contest on Facebook in 2010 judged by Edward Lucie-Smith. It was also selected in the first Javane Irani national film festival in the same year.

See also
Music of Mesopotamia

External links
Official website
Hamshahri online report of Persbookart winners exhibition
Shahr News - Edward Lucie-Smith announces the 1st Persbookart winners

Video art
Mesopotamia